Women's handball at the 2014 Asian Games was held in Incheon, South Korea from September 20 to October 1, 2014.

Squads

Results
All times are Korea Standard Time (UTC+09:00)

Preliminary round

Group A

Group B

Classification 5–8

Semifinals

Classification 7th–8th

Classification 5th–6th

Final round

Semifinals

Bronze medal match

Gold medal match

Final standing

References

Results

External links 
 Official website

Handball at the 2014 Asian Games